The Göktürk family tree refers to the ruling Ashina clan of the Turkic Khaganate, a vast medieval empire which stretched from northeast China to the Black Sea. The following family tree is given in five sections:
The united empire up to 603 (death of Tardu Khagan)
The west half of the empire which was ruled by yabgus in behalf of the central khagans up to 599 and the same half ruled independently after the empire was partitioned.
East half of the empire after 603 
The reestablishment of the empire after 681 (Second Turkic Khaganate)
West and east parts of the first empire
The color legend is as follows.

It can be seen that both the central empire and (later) the east wing were ruled by the descendants of Bumin and the west part was ruled by the descendants of İstemi with two exceptions;
 Tardu, a yabgu of the west became the central khagan between 599-603.
 Yukuk, a shad (a prince) in the east wing became the ruler of the west wing.

In the following trees only those with reigning dates became khagan or yabgu.

First Empire (before the partitioning)

Eastern Turkic Empire (after 603)

Western Turkic Empire (after 603)

First Empire (United and partitioned together)

Second Empire

Footnotes

References

Ashina tribe
Göktürks
Dynasty genealogy
Turkic rulers